Figgy Duff was a Canadian folk-rock band from Newfoundland, Canada.  They played a major role in the Newfoundland cultural renaissance of the 1970s and 1980s.  Formed in 1976 by Noel Dinn, who named the band after a traditional pudding, Figgy Duff travelled across Newfoundland, learning traditional songs and performing them with distinct elements of rock and roll.

They began working with Island Records early, though the album that resulted has yet to be released. Instead, they released their independent self-titled debut album: Figgy Duff in 1980.  The album was also released by Ottawa-based Posterity Records. It was followed by After the Tempest in 1982.

Through the next thirteen years, Figgy Duff continued touring and released three more albums: Weather Out the Storm (1989), Downstream (1993) and the compilation Retrospective (1995). 

The band's line-up changed several times, but the core of Noel Dinn and Pamela Morgan, singer-songwriter, stayed the same. Weather Out the Storm was nominated for a 1991 Juno Award. Dinn died of cancer in 1993, and Morgan disbanded Figgy Duff soon after.

The band has since reunited three times, once in 1999 for a silver anniversary tour, again in summer 2008 to celebrate the release of a CD of live recordings from the bands' previous reunion, and for the 2016 Newfoundland and Labrador Folk Festival, featuring Aaron Collis on accordion.

Discography
1980:  Figgy Duff
1982:  After the Tempest
1989:  Weather Out the Storm
1993:  Downstream
1995:  Retrospective
2008:  Figgy Duff Live Silver Reunion

References

External links
Figgy Duff official site at Amber Music
 More Figgy Duff background
Figgy Duff – Encyclopedia of Newfoundland and Labrador, v. 2, p. 62
Figgy Duff in The Canadian Encyclopedia
 

Musical groups established in 1976
Musical groups disestablished in 1995
Musical groups from Newfoundland and Labrador
Canadian folk rock groups
Celtic fusion groups
1976 establishments in Newfoundland and Labrador
1995 disestablishments in Canada
Canadian Celtic music groups